The Almshouse is a historic almshouse in Stoneham, Massachusetts.  Built in 1852, it is one of the few surviving buildings of this type in the Greater Boston area.  It is now part of the Stoneham Senior Center, and was listed on the National Register of Historic Places in 1984.

Description and history
The former Stoneham Almshouse is located in eastern Stoneham, near the town line with Wakefield on the north side of Elm Street.  It is a -story wood-frame structure, with a gabled roof, clapboarded exterior, and granite foundation.  It basically a functional vernacular structure, with minimal Greek Revival styling found in the main entrance surround.  The interior follows a relatively retardaire (out-of-date for the period) central hall plan.  The original building has been encrusted with additions to the sides and rear.

The almshouse was built in 1852 to provide facilities for the town's indigent adult population.  It was the town's second such facility, and is now one of the few in the region to survive.  Its original  lot has been reduced to just two by subdivision and development, but it retains its original long entry drive.  It served for a time in the 20th century as a nursing home, and now houses the town's senior center.

See also
National Register of Historic Places listings in Stoneham, Massachusetts
National Register of Historic Places listings in Middlesex County, Massachusetts

References

External links
Stoneham Senior Center web site

Residential buildings on the National Register of Historic Places in Massachusetts
Buildings and structures in Stoneham, Massachusetts
Residential buildings completed in 1852
Almshouses in the United States
National Register of Historic Places in Stoneham, Massachusetts
1852 establishments in Massachusetts
Housing in Massachusetts